"Turn Me On" is a song by John D. Loudermilk that was first recorded and released by Mark Dinning in 1961 as the B-side to his single "Lonely Island". Other notable versions are by Nellie Rutherford and Nina Simone. Norah Jones released her version as the last single from her debut album Come Away with Me on May 12, 2003. The song was also performed by Shelby Dressel during her American Idol audition. It has been suggested that the song influenced the composition of Leonard Cohen's 1969 song "Bird on the Wire".

Norah Jones version
Jones's cover was the seventh track on her debut album. This version also appeared in the movie Love Actually and appears on its soundtrack.

Charts

Certifications

Release history

References

1961 singles
1961 songs
2004 singles
Blue Note Records singles
Capitol Records singles
Mark Dinning songs
Nina Simone songs
Norah Jones songs
Songs written by John D. Loudermilk